David Santisteban García (born 26 June 2001) is a Spanish footballer who plays as a forward for Sevilla Atlético.

Club career
Born in La Unión, Region of Murcia, Santisteban represented EF Torre Pacheco, Kelme CF and Granada CF as a youth. On 20 August 2020, he signed for FC Cartagena and was initially assigned to the reserves in Tercera División.

Santisteban made his senior debut on 18 October 2020, starting and scoring the opener in a 2–0 home win against Racing Murcia FC. He made his first team debut the following 26 February, coming on as a late substitute for Elady Zorrilla in a 1–0 Segunda División home win against CD Leganés.

On 13 July 2021, Santisteban signed a three-year contract with Sevilla FC, being assigned to the reserves in Primera División RFEF.

Personal life
Santisteban's older brother Iván is also a footballer. A defender, he also played for Cartagena's reserve and first teams.

References

External links

2001 births
Living people
Spanish footballers
Footballers from the Region of Murcia
Association football forwards
Segunda División players
Primera Federación players
Tercera División players
FC Cartagena B players
FC Cartagena footballers
Sevilla Atlético players